The dangerous proximity doctrine is an American standard for distinguishing between preparation and attempt in a criminal case. It was advocated by Justice Oliver Wendell Holmes Jr. The standard is not a clear bright line. The evidence that preparatory acts are an actual attempt is considered to be stronger if the offense is more probable and more grave or serious. It has similarities with the physical proximity doctrine.

References

Legal doctrines and principles
Criminal law legal terminology
United States criminal law